Aasmund Kulien (4 May 1893 –  18 October 1988) was a Norwegian politician for the Labour Party.

He was elected to the Norwegian Parliament from Vest-Agder in 1937, and was re-elected on two occasions. He had previously served in the position of deputy representative during the term 1934–1936.

On the local level, Kulien was a member of Greipstad municipal council from 1928 to 1942. He chaired the regional party chapter from 1921 to 1923, and was a member of the national board from 1930 to 1939.

He was born in Kristiansand, worked as a gardener from 1908 but settled as a farmer in Greipstad in 1922. While living there, he served two years as the chief of the fire department, as well as other public posts.

References

1893 births
1988 deaths
Members of the Storting
Vest-Agder politicians
Labour Party (Norway) politicians
20th-century Norwegian politicians
Politicians from Kristiansand